István Kolnai (born 26 September 1911; date of death unknown) was a Hungarian canoeist who competed in the late 1930s. He finished 12th in the folding K-2 10000 m event at the 1936 Summer Olympics in Berlin.

References

1911 births
Year of death missing
Canoeists at the 1936 Summer Olympics
Hungarian male canoeists
Olympic canoeists of Hungary